Enkhbayar is a Mongolian personal name.
Notable people bearing this name include:
as proper name
 Batshugar Enkhbayar (born 1987), Mongolian politician
 Nambaryn Enkhbayar (born 1958), Mongolian Prime Minister in 2000–2004, and President of Mongolia in 2005–2009
 Jargalsaikhany Enkhbayar (born 1977), a Mongolian international footballer 
as patronymic